Philip Lee Williams (born January 30, 1950) is an American novelist, poet, and essayist noted for his explorations of the natural world, intense human relationships, and aging. A native of Athens, Georgia, he grew up in the nearby town of Madison. He is the winner of many literary awards including the 2004 Michael Shaara Prize for his novel A Distant Flame (St. Martin’s), an examination of southerners who were against the Confederacy’s position in the American Civil War. He is also a winner of the Townsend Prize for Fiction for his novel The Heart of a Distant Forest, and has been named Georgia Author of the Year four times. In 2007, he was recipient of a Georgia Governor’s Award in the Humanities.  Williams's The Divine Comics: A Vaudeville Show in Three Acts, a 1000-page re-imagining of Dante's magnum opus, was published in the fall of 2011.  His latest novel, Emerson's Brother, came out in May 2012 from Mercer University Press

Biography 
Philip Lee Williams was born in 1950, one of three children of Ruth Sisk Williams (1924–2008) and Marshall Woodson Williams (1922– ). He, his parents, and his older brother John Mark Williams (b. 1948), moved to Madison, Georgia, in 1953, where Marshall Williams had accepted a job as a chemistry teacher at Morgan County High School. Williams also has a sister, Laura Jane Williams, born in 1959.

Williams began his creative work by composing music and writing poetry while still in his teens. He graduated from Morgan County High School in 1968 and from the University of Georgia in 1972 with a degree in journalism and minors in history and English. In 1972, he married Linda Rowley. They have two children, Brandon and Megan.

He finished more than half of his master's degree in English at the University of Georgia before sustaining a serious back injury in 1974. After that, he spent 13 years as an award-winning journalist before becoming a science writer at his alma mater in 1985. As a journalist he worked for The Clayton Tribune (Clayton, Georgia), the Athens Daily News (Athens, Ga.), The Madisonian (Madison, Ga.), and The Athens Observer (Athens, Ga.)

Williams retired in 2010 from the University of Georgia, where he was a writer and taught creative writing.

In 2010, Williams was inducted into the Georgia Writers Hall of Fame, alongside Flannery O'Connor, Martin Luther King Jr., James Dickey, and fellow University of Georgia graduate Natasha Trethewey.

Novels 
Williams is best known for his work as a novelist. Of his 18 published books, 12 are novels.

His first novel, The Heart of a Distant Forest (W.W. Norton, 1984) is the story of a retired junior college history professor who has returned to his home place on a pond in north central Georgia to spend the last year of his life. The book won the Townsend Prize for fiction in 1986 and has subsequently come out in editions from Ballantine Books, Peachtree Publishers, and the University of Georgia Press. It was also translated into Swedish and published in a large-print format.

Williams’s second novel, All the Western Stars (Peachtree Publisher, 1988) is the story of two old men who run away from a rest home to become cowboys on a ranch in Texas. This book also came out in an edition from Ballantine and was translated into German. Richard Zanuck and David Brown optioned the book for MGM as a film project, though it was never put into production there. (MGM hired Williams to write one version of the screenplay.) Instead, the project was picked up by Rysher Entertainment, where it was greenlighted, with Jack Lemmon and James Garner to star. When Lemmon withdrew from the project, the film was shelved and has yet to be made.

Subsequent novels include:

Slow Dance in Autumn (Peachtree Publishers, 1988)
The Song of Daniel (Peachtree Publishers, 1989)
Perfect Timing (Peachtree Publishers, 1991)
Final Heat (Turtle Bay Books/Random House, 1992)
Blue Crystal (Grove Press, 1993)
he True and Authentic History of Jenny Dorset (Longstreet Press, 1997)
A Distant Flame (Thomas Dunne Books/St. Martin’s, 2004)
The Campfire Boys (Mercer University Press, 2009)
The Divine Comics: A Vaudeville Show in Three Acts (Mercer University Press, 2011)
Emerson's Brother (Mercer University Press, 2012)
Far Beyond the Gates : a novel (Mercer University Press, 2020)

Slow Dance in Autumn was translated into Japanese, and Final Heat into German and French. Perfect Timing was optioned for film by director Ron Howard and was a Literary Guild selection. Actress Meg Ryan optioned an unpublished novel of Williams's for her production company.

A Distant Flame is perhaps Williams’s most notable book to date and won the 2004 Michael Shaara Award for Excellence in Civil War Fiction award.

Poetry 
Williams began his creative career as a poet and began publishing in small magazines while he was still an undergraduate. He has published poetry in more than 40 magazines and continues in such magazines as Poetry, Karamu, and the Kentucky Poetry Review.

Williams has published poetry in journals and magazines for decades. His books include:

Elegies for the Water (Mercer University Press, 2009)
The Flower Seeker, An Epic Poem of William Bartram (Mercer University Press, 2010)
The Color of All Things: 99 Love Poems (Mercer University Press, 2015)

Non-fiction writing 
In addition to his work as a novelist, Philip Lee Williams has published four books of creative non-fiction:

It is Written: My Life in Letters (Mercer University Press, 2014)
The Silent Stars Go By (Hill Street Press, 1998)
Crossing Wildcat Ridge: A Memoir of Nature and Healing (University of Georgia Press, 1999)
In the Morning: Reflections from First Light (Mercer University Press, 2005)

Other creative work 
Williams is also a documentary film-maker whose films have won awards from the New York Film Festival, the Columbus (Ohio) Film Festival, and the Telly Awards. Among the documentaries he has written and co-produced are Hugh Kenner: A Modern Master and Eugene Odum: An Ecologist’s Life. His work has also appeared in numerous anthologies.

A composer, Williams has to his credit 18 symphonies, chamber works, concerti, and much incidental and church music. Only a small amount of this has been performed in public as Williams has preferred to keep his output private. He also paints and carves in alabaster.

Recent awards
 The Campfire Boys - 2010 Georgia Author of the Year Award (Novel)
 The Flower Seeker, An Epic Poem of William Bartram, Book of the Year, Books and Culture magazine; also Georgia Author of the Year award (Poetry)

References 

Georgia Writers Hall of Fame 
Georgia Encyclopedia

External links
Official web site of Philip Lee Williams
Profile of Williams on Southern Nature Writers web site
Atlanta Magazine, October 2009
Extensive interview with Williams in the Istanbul Literature Review in Turkey
Profile and video clips of Philip Lee Williams in The New Georgia Encyclopedia
Article about 2007 Georgia Governor’s Awards in the Humanities Recipients, including Williams
Review of A Distant Flame by Hugh Ruppersburg on the Blogcritics web site
Review of A Distant Flame from Civil War Book Review
New York Times review of Williams’s first novel, The Heart of a Distant Forest

1950 births
20th-century American novelists
21st-century American novelists
American male novelists
Living people
University of Georgia alumni
University of Georgia faculty
Writers from Athens, Georgia
People from Madison, Georgia
20th-century American poets
21st-century American poets
American male poets
20th-century American male writers
21st-century American male writers
Novelists from Georgia (U.S. state)
20th-century American non-fiction writers
21st-century American non-fiction writers
American male non-fiction writers